Veøy Church is a parish church of the Church of Norway in Molde Municipality in Møre og Romsdal county, Norway. It is located in the village of Sølsnes. It is the main church for the Røvik og Veøy parish which is part of the Molde domprosti (arch-deanery) in the Diocese of Møre. The red, wooden church was built in a long church design in the dragestil style in 1907 by the architect Karl Norum. The church seats about 212 people.

History
Towards the end of the 19th century, the island of Veøya had long since been depopulated, with the exception of the clergy family and its household, so it was difficult to maintain a main parish church such as the Old Veøy Church on the island. In 1901, it was decided to take the island's medieval church out of use as a parish church and move the church site to Sølsnes on the mainland nearby. The new church was designed by the architect Karl Norum. The new building was completed and consecrated in 1907.

Media gallery

See also
List of churches in Møre

References

Buildings and structures in Molde
Churches in Møre og Romsdal
Long churches in Norway
Wooden churches in Norway
20th-century Church of Norway church buildings
Churches completed in 1907
1907 establishments in Norway
National Romantic architecture in Norway
Art Nouveau church buildings in Norway